The Sayramsu is a river of southern Kazakhstan. It is a tributary of the Badam near Shymkent.

Rivers of Kazakhstan